A west wind is a wind that originates in the west and blows in an eastward direction.

Mythology and Literature 
In European tradition, it has usually been considered the mildest and most favorable of the directional winds.

In Greek mythology, Zephyrus was the personification of the west wind and the bringer of light spring and early summer breezes; his Roman equivalent was Favonius (hence the adjective favonian, pertaining to the west wind). 

In Egyptian mythology, Ḥutchai is the god of the west wind. He was depicted as a man with the head of a serpent.

Geoffrey Chaucer wrote of the "swete breth" of Zephyrus, and a soft, gentle breeze may be referred to as a zephyr, as in William Shakespeare's Cymbeline (IV, ii): "They are as gentle / As zephyrs blowing below the violet, / Not wagging his sweet head."

In Iroquois tradition, the "west wind" is brought by the Panther, ugly and fierce.
A west wind can be known as a zephyr.

In Italic history, Ponente was the west wind and the personification of spring and early summer; his winds were usually calm and lukewarm and very gentle; his roman equivalent is Zephyrus.

See also

East wind
Fremantle Doctor
North wind
South wind
Westerlies
Eros and Psyche

Greek mythology
Winds